The M2 line, also referred as Üçyol–Çamlıkule Line is a planned ATO rapid transit line in İzmir, Turkey. When completed, the line will become the third driverless metro line in Turkey, after the M5 and M7 lines in Istanbul. Construction started in February 14, 2022 and the line is expected to enter service in 2026.
It will cost $765 million, and the yearly expected profit from operation is $45 million.

History

Background
Buca is the most populous district in Izmir and is one of the city's oldest settlements. Despite this, the only form of public transportation (aside from buses) is the Southern Line of the İZBAN commuter rail system, which runs along the far west side of the district. Prior to 2006, a railway to Buca was in service which provided commuter trains to Basmane and Alsancak stations in central İzmir. The railway was closed down in 2006, due to construction of the Şirinyer Tunnel, thus leaving central Buca without any access to rail transportation.

Plans to construct a metro line to Buca were first announced in 2005, but due to problems with the construction of the Üçyol-Fahrettin Altay extension, these plans were suspended. In 2009, the İzmir Metropolitan Municipality released a master plan for public transportation in the city. Included in this plan was a tram line from Şirinyer to central Buca. However, the Buca tram line was removed from the plan due to pressure from the Ministry of Transport.

Planning
Once the Fahrettin Altay extension of the existing metro line was completed in 2014, the city shifted its focus to the Buca metro. The line was originally planned to consist of seven stations and terminate at Buca Koop., one station before Çamlıkule. The plans were handed to the Ministry of Transport for evaluation in August 2015. The evaluation process took 12 months and was modified to extend the line from Buca Koop. to Çamlıkule as well as redesign the western end of the line as a loop. West of General Asım Gündüz station, the line would split and form a loop with Üçyol placed at the top. The northeastern part of the loop would consist of a station at Zafertepe, while the southwestern part would consist of a station at Bozyaka. The two sections would meet at Üçyol. A new maintenance facility in Tınaztepe was also included. The plan was finalized by the İzmir Municipality and submitted for an Environmental impact assessment in July 2017. Construction is expected to begin in 2022 and completed by 2026. Due to a contest notice filed by the 9th September University, the maintenance facility location changed to Adatepe. This also required a minor change in the location of the Kasaplar station.

Construction
The groundbreaking ceremony was held in February 2022.

Funding
The European Bank for Reconstruction and Development agreed to a loan of €754.5 million in January 2020 to fund the line's construction.

The construction tender will take place on 14 January 2021 and the construction will continue for four years. The metro line will consist of 11 stations and will be 13,5 km long. All of the metro route will be constructed with deep tunnel.

Stations
The line will consist of eleven stations, of which ten are new and one (Üçyol) will connect to the existing line. The list of stations are as follows:
 Üçyol
 Zafertepe
 Bozyaka
 General Asım Gündüz
 Şirinyer
  Buca Belediye
  Kasaplar Meydanı
  Hasanağa Parkı
  D.E.Ü. Tınaztepe Kampüsü
 Buca Koop.
 Çamlıkule

References

İzmir Metro
750 V DC railway electrification
Rail transport in İzmir
Standard gauge railways in Turkey
2024 in rail transport